Ruslan Imranovich Khasbulatov (22 November 1942 – 3 January 2023) was a Russian economist and politician and the former Chairman of Parliament of Russia of Chechen descent who played a central role in the events leading to the 1993 constitutional crisis in the Russian Federation.

Early life
Khasbulatov was born in Tolstoy-Yurt, a village near Grozny, the capital of Chechnya, on 22 November 1942. In February 1944, he was deported to Central Asia during the Chechen deportations.

After studying in Almaty, Khasbulatov moved to Moscow in 1962, where he studied law at the prestigious Moscow State University. After graduating in 1966, he joined the Communist Party of the Soviet Union. He continued his studies, focusing on the political, social and economic development of capitalist countries, and received several higher degrees between 1970 and 1980. During the 1970s and 1980s, he published a number of books on international economics and trade.

Political career

Entry into political life 
In the late 1980s, Khasbulatov began to work closely with rising maverick in the Communist Party Boris Yeltsin. He was elected to the Congress of People's Deputies of the Russian SFSR in 1990. He followed Yeltsin in the successful resistance to the putsch attempt in 1991. He quit the Communist Party in August 1991, and on 29 October 1991, he was elected speaker of the Supreme Soviet of RSFSR.

1993 Constitutional Crisis 
Khasbulatov had been an ally of Yeltsin in this period, and played a key role in leading the resistance to the 1991 coup attempt. However, he and Yeltsin drifted apart following the collapse of the Soviet Union at the end of 1991.

After the collapse of the USSR, Khasbulatov consolidated his control over the Russian parliament and became the second most powerful man in Russia after Yeltsin himself. Among other factors, the escalating clash of egos between Khasbulatov and Yeltsin led to the Russian constitutional crisis of 1993, in which Khasbulatov (along with Vice-President Alexander Rutskoy) led the Supreme Soviet of Russia in its power struggle with the president, which ended with Yeltsin's violent assault on and subsequent dissolution of the parliament in October 1993.

Khasbulatov was arrested along with the other leaders of the parliament. In 1994, the newly elected Duma pardoned him along with other key leaders of the anti-Yeltsin resistance.

Chechen politics 
Khasbulatov considered running as a candidate in the 2003 election for President of the Chechen Republic, following the Second Chechen War, but ultimately chose not to run. In the 2021 Chechen head election, he endorsed incumbent Ramzan Kadyrov.

Later life
Following the end of his political career, Khasbulatov returned to his earlier profession as a teacher of economics as founder and head of the Department of International Economy at the Plekhanov Russian Academy of Economics (REA). He continued to comment on political developments in Russia. His death was reported on 3 January 2023.

Further reading
 Ostrovsky, Alexander (2014). Расстрел «Белого дома». Чёрный октябрь 1993 (The shooting of the "White House". Black October 1993) — М.: «Книжный мир», 2014. — 640 с. ISBN 978-5-8041-0637-0

References

"Руслан Имранович Хасбулатов" (Ruslan Hasbulatov). www.peoples.ru (In Russian). Retrieved 24 January 2010.
Хасбулатов Руслан Имранович". Biografija.ru. (In Russian). Retrieved 24 January 2010.

 
 

1942 births
2023 deaths
Chechen politicians
Moscow State University alumni
Academic staff of the Plekhanov Russian University of Economics
Corresponding Members of the Russian Academy of Sciences
People of the Chechen wars
Russian politicians
Russian economists
Communist Party of the Soviet Union members
Russian people of Chechen descent
Chechen people
Defenders of the White House (1991)
Defenders of the White House (1993)
Honoured Scientists of the Russian Federation